Acon or ACON may refer to:

Acon, Eure, a commune in the Eure department in northern France
Aconitum, a plant used in homeopathy
Åcon, science fiction convention held in Mariehamn, Åland, Finland
Africa Cup of Nations, a football tournament
ACON Investments, American international private equity investment company
ACON Health, Australian NSW Health organisation

People with the surname
Daniel Acon (born 1958), American special effects coordinator

See also
Akon (born 1973), American crunk and hip hop recording artist
A-Kon, anime convention held in Dallas, Texas
Abdus Sattar Akon, Bangladeshi politician